Bosniaks are an ethnic group living in Slovenia. According to the last census from 2002, the total number of Bosniaks in Slovenia was 21,542 as they comprised 1.6% of the total population of Slovenia. According to the last census, they are the third largest minority ethnic group in Slovenia, after Serbs and Croats.

Geography
Bosniaks in Slovenia primarily live in the capital city of Slovenia; Ljubljana. There are dispersed populations of Bosniaks living in various cities and towns in Slovenia, though most choose to live in Ljubljana. Many Bosniaks have left Slovenia for other Western countries and Bosnia. Bosniaks make up a tiny percentage of Slovenia's population, however today, many Bosniaks have retained their identity and culture.

History

During the First World War, a Bosniak regiment made up primarily of Bosnian Muslims were sent to fight on the Italian front. One of the soldiers who fought there was a boy called Elez Dervišević, the youngest soldier to fight in the Soca battle in World War I. Elez was 11 years old when he served in the Austro-Hungarian Army. In Log pod Mangartom there is a statue of Elez's father dedicated to him.

Many Bosniaks have emigrated to Slovenia from their native Bosnia since the 1960s, primarily due to economic factors and chances for better employment. At the time, it was noted that most of the general Slovenian population looked down on their neighbors from other Yugoslav republics, but among others, Bosniaks and Serbs were the most disliked and unwelcomed. This mindset would continue well after the break-up of Yugoslavia, as Slovenia was the only member-country of the EU to oppose Croatia's EU bid, despite Croats and Slovenes historically sharing more cultural and traditional values than any other southern Slavic nations (such as being the only predominant Catholic nations in the former Yugoslavia). Slovenians grouped Bosniaks with Serbians, Croatians and Macedonians. These groups were often called južnjaki (southerners), ta spodni (those from down there), čefurj and Švedi (Swedes), all had negative connotations.

Religion
Today, the majority of Bosniaks are predominantly Sunni Muslim and adhere to the Hanafi school of thought, or law, the largest and oldest school of Islamic law in jurisprudence within Sunni Islam.

Notable people
Muamer Vugdalić, footballer
Samir Handanović, footballer 
Jasmin Handanović, footballer 
Jasmin Kurtić, footballer
Edo Murić, basketball player 
Dino Murić, basketball player 
Mirza Begić, basketball player 
Alen Omić, basketball player 
Emir Preldžić, basketball player 
Jusuf Nurkić, basketball player 
Rašid Mahalbašić, basketball player for Austria
Adnan Bešić, footballer 
Suad Fileković, footballer 
Fuad Gazibegović, footballer 
Hasan Rizvić, basketball player 
Aris Zarifović, footballer
Haris Vučkić, footballer 
Alen Vučkić, footballer 
Miral Samardžić, footballer 
Bekim Kapić, footballer 
Amir Dervišević, footballer 
Mustafa Bešić, former ice hockey player 
Armin Bačinović, footballer
Jasmin Hukić, basketball player
Teoman Alibegović, former basketball player 
Amar Alibegović, basketball player

See also
Demographics of Slovenia

References

 
 
Ethnic groups in Slovenia
Bosniak diaspora
Muslim communities in Europe